The Weststadt ("western city") is a Stadtbezirk (borough) in the western part of Braunschweig, Germany. With a population of 23,298 (2020) it is the city's third most populous district.

History and geography
The Weststadt is a planned community, divided into five neighbourhoods. Building of the district started in 1960–61. Also located within the district is the Westpark, a large park and recreational area.

Gallery

Politics
The district mayor Ulrich Römer is a member of the Social Democratic Party of Germany.

References

Weststadt